New Normal or The New Normal may refer to:
 New normal, the prevailing situation following widespread crisis
 The New Normal (album), a 2005 album by Cog
 The New Normal (TV series), a 2012 television series
 "The New Normal" (Amphibia), an episode of Amphibia
 "New Normal" (Homeland), a 2015 episode of Homeland
 New Normal Music, an internet radio station
 "A New Normal", a 2008 episode of Greek
 New Normal: The Survival Guide, a series of programs on GMA News TV